Guerau de Espés del Valle (1524 in Lleida – 1572) was a Spanish nobleman and diplomat. He served as Philip II of Spain's ambassador to Elizabeth I of England from 1568 to 1571 during one of the tensest moments in Anglo-Spanish relations and was expelled after being accused of complicity of the Ridolfi plot. He was a knight of the Order of Calatrava. He also appeared as a character in the 2007 film Elizabeth: The Golden Age, played by the British actor Will Houston.

Life
John Man, English ambassador in Madrid, had called the pope a sanctimonious little monk and so Philip II replaced the priest Diego de Silva y Guzmán with Espés as ambassador to England. Due to his hostility to the English, Espés described William Cecil, 1st Baron Burghley, one of the most powerful and influential noblemen in England at that time, to Philip II as 

In the Spanish Netherlands the Geuzens' Revolt began and in November 1568 the royal treasury in Seville sent five ships with 40,000 pounds of gold, with which Fernando Álvarez de Toledo, Duke of Alba was to raise troops in the Netherlands to quell the revolt. These ships were attacked by Huguenot privateers and sought protection in British waters. Espés told Elizabeth that the gold belonged to Philip's bankers and was being sent to Antwerp and asked that Elizabeth protect the ships. She agreed and most of the ships anchored in English ports. However, news then reached Elizabeth of a Spanish attack on the British ships in San Juan de Ulúa port and in reprisal ordered that the Spanish ships be confiscated and their gold moved to the Tower of London. On Espés's advice, Alva then seized the goods of English merchant ships anchored at Antwerp.

In a letter dated 14 February 1569 Espés wrote that John Hawkins had founded a colony in Florida in lieu of that lost at San Juan de Ulúa. He was finally expelled from England for his alleged complicity in the Ridolfi plot. He also had a surviving correspondence in April 1571.

Notes

1524 births
1572 deaths
Ambassadors of Spain to England
16th-century Spanish diplomats